Greenleaf Lake may refer to:

Greenleaf Lake (Le Sueur County, Minnesota), U.S.
Greenleaf Lake (Meeker County, Minnesota), U.S.
Greenleaf Lake (Oklahoma), U.S.

See also
Greenleaf (disambiguation)